Pepper II is an arcade video game programmed by Exidy and published in 1982. Despite its name, there was no predecessor named Pepper or Pepper I. Its gameplay is similar to the game Amidar by Konami and Stern Electronics. Coleco published Pepper II for its ColecoVision home system.

The game plays Gounod's "Funeral March of a Marionette" when gameplay starts.

Gameplay
There are four mazes per level in Pepper II. Each maze has exits leading to three other mazes. All four mazes must be filled to advance to the next level. To fill in a maze, the player maneuvers "Pepper" around different segments of the maze. As Pepper travels, he leaves a "zipper". Once he encloses or "zips" a segment, it fills in and points are awarded. If Pepper backtracks on an uncompleted segment, it unzips.

The character "Pepper" is an angel. There are two types of enemies that must be avoided: Roaming Eyes and the Whippersnapper (Zipper Ripper on the ColecoVision version) who unzips all uncompleted, zipped segments by moving over them. Pepper's one defense is to enclose an area containing a pitchfork, which turns him into a devil for approximately four seconds. At that time he can go after all Roaming Eyes for points while the Whippersnapper freezes. There are four pitchforks in the corners of every maze. A deluxe energizer is located in the center of each maze. This energizer alternates between being a pitchfork and a halo symbol. If Pepper encloses the middle area when the energizer is a halo, the Whippersnapper disappears from the maze.

Points are made for enclosing a segment, consuming a pair of roaming eyes when energized by the pitchfork (similar to Pac-Man), obtaining prizes, completing a maze, and completing four mazes. A bonus turn is awarded at 40,000, 50,000, 70,000 or 90,000 points, depending on the dip switch settings.  When a full screen (of the four) has been completely filled, "Zip-a-Dee-Doo-Dah" is briefly heard. When four full screens are completed, a small cube appears at the bottom of the screen to mark your progress at completing cubes.

Each maze also contains a prize in one of the segments. The player must enclose the area it appears in to gain the prize and points, and then the prize is shown beneath the maze.

Development
The original working title of the game was Zipper. The name was hastily changed after a copyright search revealed an unrelated product by the same name. The NABU Network service featured a game titled Zipper, which is almost identical in gameplay to Pepper II; suggesting it may have been an actual port based on the scrapped design plan.

See also
Triple Punch

References

External links 
 Arcade manual at the Internet Archive
 

1982 video games
Arcade video games
ColecoVision games
Fiction about the Devil
Exidy games
Maze games
Video games about demons
Video games developed in the United States